The Ok Tedi Mine is an open-pit copper and gold mine in Papua New Guinea located near the headwaters of the Ok Tedi River, in the Star Mountains Rural LLG of the North Fly District of the Western Province of Papua New Guinea.

The mine is operated by Ok Tedi Mining (OTM), which is majority-owned by the PNG Sustainable Development Program Limited (PNGSDPL). In 2013 it was nationalised by the Government of Papua New Guinea in  controversial action. Prior to 2002, it was majority owned by BHP Billiton, the largest mining company in the world since a merger in 2001.

Located in a remote area of PNG, above  on Mount Fubilan, in a region of high rainfall and frequent earthquakes, mine development posed serious challenges. The town of Tabubil was built to serve the mining operation.

History
Before mining operations, Mount Fubilan was described as a copper mountain with a gold cap. Exploratory drilling in the area began in the 1970s, and was run by the Kennecott Copper Corporation.

In the early 1980s, BHP secured a mining lease. The first gold was mined at Ok Tedi in 1981. Bechtel, in a joint venture agreement, provided engineering, procurement, and construction services. In 1984, BHP began exploiting the gold cap by using cyanide extraction procedures. After the gold deposit was depleted, the company surveyed for mining the much larger copper deposit underneath. At that time, this deposit was believed to be the largest copper deposit in the world. BHP entered into a partnership with the Government of Papua New Guinea, Amoco and Inmet Mining, to mine the copper deposit. BHP maintained a majority share in the mine.

In 2002, BHP Billiton completed its withdrawal from the project by transferring its majority shareholding to the PNG Sustainable Development Program in response to the ongoing Ok Tedi environmental disaster. After the transfer, project shareholding was as follows: PNG Sustainable Development Program Limited (52%), the State of Papua New Guinea (30%) and Inmet Mining Corporation (18%).

All mining operations at Fubilan have had their headquarters at Tabubil.

Infrastructure
As a substantial economic entity in Papua New Guinea and the Western Province, accounting for over half of the entire province's economy and 25.7% of the country's entire export earnings, the mine has been responsible for a large amount of the infrastructure.

The mine

The mine works as an open cut operation and Mount Fubilan has been reduced to a deep pit in the ground.

In addition, between 1985 and 1990, 47.642 tonnes (1,531,700 ounces) of gold bullion were produced.

The mill

There is a mill adjacent to the mine that transforms the raw material mined into copper concentrate slurry plus a small quantity of gold. The mill operates two sag mills each with two associated ball mills. Copper concentrate is produced as slurry and piped 137 km (85 mi) along the Kiunga-Tabubil Highway to Kiunga, the main port of the district, where it is shipped via river barge along the Fly River.

Ok Menga

The mine is powered by a hydroelectric power facility at Ok Menga, which is a tributary of the Ok Tedi River near Tabubil. There are also backup diesel generators that are used if the flow from the Ok Menga river is not enough to generate sufficient electricity.

Kiunga-Tabubil Highway

The Kiunga-Tabubil Highway is maintained by Ok Tedi Mining, as the mine is the greatest beneficiary of the road. The highway, for the most part, runs parallel with the Ok Tedi River. Parts of the highway are often consumed by the river and need to be rebuilt. The cost of maintaining this road is K1.5 million a year. The copper slurry pipeline to Kiunga from the mine runs along the full length of this road.

Tabubil

Tabubil is a township in the North Fly District of Western Province, Papua New Guinea, about 20 km south along the Kiunga-Tabubil Highway from the minesite. The town, including the adjoining relocated village of Wangbin and the industrial area of Laytown, is the largest settlement in the province. Although the provincial capital, Daru, is almost the same size.

The town was established primarily to serve the Ok Tedi Mine. The OTM headquarters are located in a building called the White House, which is about 500 metres south of Tabubil International School, and about 300 metres east of the Cloudlands hotel.

The mine has a backup diesel generating power facility at Tabubil.

Kiunga

Kiunga is the port town that services the mine on the Fly River. The township, which had a population of 8,300 in the year 2000 census, is the terminus of the Kiunga-Tabubil Highway, and the copper concentrate slurry pipeline, about 140 km by road from the minesite.

Local industry rests on a cornerstone of freight and haulage, particularly servicing the mine and the town of Tabubil. The town is the headquarters of the North Fly District.

Environmental impact

In 1999, BHP reported that the project was the cause of "major environmental damage". The mine operators discharge 80 million tons of contaminated tailings, overburden and mine-induced erosion into the river system each year.

The discharge caused widespread and diverse harm, both environmentally and socially, to the 50,000 people who live in the 120 villages downstream of the mine. Chemicals from the tailings killed or contaminated fish, which subsequently caused harm to all animal species that live in the area as well as the indigenous people. The dumping changed the riverbed, causing a relatively deep and slow river to become shallower and develop rapids thereby disrupting indigenous transportation routes. Flooding caused by the raised riverbed left a thick layer of contaminated mud on the flood plain where the plantations of taro, bananas and sago palm that are the staples of the local diet grow.

About 1300 square kilometres (500 mi²) were damaged in this way. Although the concentration of copper in the water is about 30 times above the standard level, it is still below the World Health Organization (WHO) standards. Concerns have been raised of potential impact of the mine waste on the northern Great Barrier Reef, which is located offshore from the river mouth.  Sediment core samples collected from the Fly Delta in 1990 showed no detectable increase in copper concentration above background levels.

The United Nations Environment Programme has noted that the Ok Tedi mine site's "uncontrolled discharge of 70 million tonnes of waste rock and mine tailings annually has spread more than  down the Ok Tedi and Fly rivers, raising river beds and causing flooding, sediment deposition, forest damage, and a serious decline in the area's biodiversity." The resulting devastation caused by the mining of Ok Tedi has included the loss of fish, a vital food source for the local community; loss of forest and crops due to flooding; and the loss of "areas of deep spiritual value for villagers are now submerged in mine tailings."

See also

 Porgera Gold Mine

References

External links
 Ok Tedi Mining
 Photos of Ok Tedi Mine
 Photo Gallery: Mining in Papua New Guinea 1983-2010

BHP
Copper mines in Papua New Guinea
Gold mines in Papua New Guinea
Surface mines in Papua New Guinea
Western Province (Papua New Guinea)